Simcox is a surname. Notable people with the surname include:

A. J. Simcox, American baseball player
Carroll Eugene Simcox, American Episcopal priest and editor of The Living Church magazine
Chris Simcox, American co-founder of the Minuteman Civil Defense Corps (MCDC)
Christopher Simcox, English double murderer
Edith Simcox, British writer and feminist
George Augustus Simcox, British classical scholar
Grover Simcox, American illustrator
Robert Simcox, American talk radio host
Tom Simcox, American former actor